Kalovo may refer to:

Kalovo, Bulgaria, village in Bulgaria
Kalovo (Trgovište), village in Serbia